"Angels We Have Heard on High" is a Christmas carol to the hymn tune "Gloria" from a traditional French song of unknown origin called "", with paraphrased English lyrics by James Chadwick. The song's subject is the birth of Jesus Christ as narrated in the Gospel of Luke, specifically the scene outside Bethlehem in which shepherds encounter a multitude of angels singing and praising the newborn child.

Tune
"Angels We Have Heard on High" is generally sung to the hymn tune "Gloria", a traditional French carol as arranged by Edward Shippen Barnes. Its most memorable feature is its chorus, "Gloria in excelsis Deo", where the "o" of "Gloria" is fluidly sustained through 16 notes of a rising and falling melismatic melodic sequence.

In England, the words of James Montgomery's "Angels from the Realms of Glory" are usually sung to this tune, with the "Gloria in excelsis Deo" refrain text replacing Montgomery's. It is from this usage that the tune sometimes is known as "Iris", the name of Montgomery's newspaper.

Lyrics
The lyrics of "Angels We Have Heard on High" are inspired by, but not an exact translation of, the traditional French carol known as "" ("the angels in our countryside"), whose first known publication was in 1842. The music was attributed to "W. M.". According to some websites, the hymn is by the nineteenth-century Wilfrid Moreau from Poitiers. "Angels We Have Heard on High" is the most-common English version, an 1862 paraphrase by James Chadwick, the Roman Catholic Bishop of Hexham and Newcastle, northeast England. Chadwick's lyrics are original in some sections, including the title, and loosely translated from the French in other sections. The carol quickly became popular in the West Country, where it was described as "Cornish" by R. R. Chope, and featured in William Adair Pickard-Cambridge's Collection of Dorset Carols. It has since been translated into other languages, and is widely sung and published. Modern hymnals usually include three verses.

English
Angels we have heard on high
Sweetly singing o'er the plains
And the mountains in reply
Echoing their joyous strains
|: Gloria in excelsis Deo! :|

Shepherds, why this jubilee?
Why your joyous strains prolong?
What the gladsome tidings be?
Which inspire your heavenly songs?
|: Gloria in excelsis Deo! :|

Come to Bethlehem and see
Him whose birth the angels sing;
Come, adore on bended knee,
Christ the Lord, the newborn King.
|: Gloria in excelsis Deo! :|

See Him in a manger laid
Whom the choirs of angels praise;
Mary, Joseph, lend your aid,
While our heart in love we raise. 
|: Gloria in excelsis Deo! :|

French
Les anges dans nos campagnes
Ont entonné l'hymne des cieux,
Et l'écho de nos montagnes
Redit ce chant mélodieux
|: Gloria in excelsis Deo! :|

Bergers, pour qui cette fête?
Quel est l'objet de tous ces chants?
Quel vainqueur, quelle conquête
Mérite ces cris triomphants?
|: Gloria in excelsis Deo! :|

Ils annoncent la naissance
Du libérateur d'Israël
Et pleins de reconnaissance
Chantent en ce jour solennel
|: Gloria in excelsis Deo! :|

German 
Maria Luise Thurmair wrote a German version, "Engel auf den Feldern singen" (Angels sing in the fields). The same melody was used by Diethard Zils for a hymn for Epiphany, "Seht ihr unsern Stern dort stehen" (Do your see our star). Both hymns are part of the Catholic hymnal Gotteslob.

See also
"Ding Dong Merrily on High" – similar Gloria refrain
 List of Christmas carols

References

External links

 
 
 "Hört, der Engel helle Lieder" (in German), in Liederkunde zum Evangelischen Gesangbuch, no. 12, pp. 39–42. Vandenhoeck & Ruprecht, 2000
  (François-Auguste Gevaert)

Christmas carols
French folk songs
1862 songs
French-language Christmas carols